The Bianca di Saluzzo is a traditional breed of chicken originating in the Piedmont region of north-western Italy. It takes its name either from the town of Saluzzo, in the province of Cuneo, or from the former Marquisate of Saluzzo, which approximately coincides with its area of distribution. It may also be called the Bianca di Cavour, after the nearby town of Cavour, in the province of Turin.

History
The Bianca di Saluzzo was once abundant in Piemonte, especially in the historic Marquisate of Saluzzo and in neighbouring comuni such as Cavour, Villafranca and Garzigliana. In the 1960s, industrialisation and intensive agriculture caused a decline in the breed, which is suitable only for free-range management. Recovery began in 1999 under the auspices of the Istituto Professionale per l'Agricoltura e l'Ambiente (professional institute for agriculture and the environment) of Verzuolo, in the province of Cuneo. A breed standard has been submitted to the Federazione Italiana Associazioni Avicole, the federation of Italian poultry associations.

Breed numbers remain low. A study published in 2007 used a figure of approximately 700 for the total breeding stock, of which approximately 200 were cocks.

Characteristics
The Bianca di Saluzzo is white, with yellow skin, legs and ear-lobes. The comb is single and large, with 4–6 points.

The eggs are white and weigh approximately 50 g.

Uses
The Bianca di Saluzzo is a dual-purpose breed. Hens begin to lay at 6–7 months, and may lay approximately 180 eggs per year.

For meat production, birds may reach a final weight of 1.7–1.8 kg at about 22 weeks; capons weigh around 3 kg at 30 weeks.

References 

Chicken breeds
Chicken breeds originating in Italy
Ark of Taste foods
Marquisate of Saluzzo